Robert M. Walsh (c. 1919 – ?) was an American football coach.  He was the head football coach at St. Benedict's College—now known as Benedictine College—in Atchison, Kansas from 1948 to 1949, compiling a record of 4–14.  In 1950, Walsh was hired as an assistant football coach at the University of Toledo to serve under head coach Bob Snyder.  Walsh played college football at the University of Notre Dame as a guard, lettering in 1941.  He spent one season as freshman line coach at Notre Dame, in 1942, before he was commissioned into the United States Navy in January 1943.  Walsh was hired in 1946 as the athletic director at Parks Air College—now known as Parks College of Engineering, Aviation and Technology in St. Louis, Missouri.

Head coaching record

References

Year of birth missing
Year of death missing
American football guards
Benedictine Ravens football coaches
Benedictine Ravens men's basketball coaches
Notre Dame Fighting Irish football coaches
Notre Dame Fighting Irish football players
Toledo Rockets football coaches
United States Navy personnel of World War II
United States Navy officers